Kelly Ann Parsons (born 23 November 1979), known professionally as Kelly Brook, is an English model, actress, and media personality. She is known for her modelling work in the UK, and in the US for her role as Prudence on the NBC sitcom One Big Happy (2015).

Brook began her career modelling for a range of advertising campaigns, which led her discovery by the editorial team of the Daily Star tabloid, where they began featuring her as a Page Three girl. She was crowned FHMs Sexiest Woman in the World in 2005, and as of 2015, she had appeared in every FHM 100 Sexiest countdown since 1998.

Brook has appeared on numerous British television shows, including The Big Breakfast (1999), Strictly Come Dancing (2007), Britain's Got Talent (2009), Celebrity Juice (2012–2015), It's Not Me, It's You (2016), Loose Women (2018), and The Great Stand Up to Cancer Bake Off (2020). As an actress, she has appeared in the films Ripper (2001), House of 9 (2004), Survival Island (2005), Piranha 3D (2010), and Taking Stock (2015).

Brook currently co-presents Heart London's Drivetime Radio Show with Jason King. She also co-presents the National Heart radio show on the Feel Good Weekend on Saturdays from 9am to 12pm.

Early life
Brook was born Kelly Ann Parsons in Rochester, Kent, the daughter of Sandra Kelly, a cook, and Kenneth Parsons, a scaffolder. She has a younger brother, Damian, and an older half-sister, Sasha. Kenneth Parsons died, aged 57, in Rochester from lung cancer, on 26 November 2007, during Brook's time on Strictly Come Dancing. Brook attended the Thomas Aveling School in Warren Wood, Rochester. In 1996 at the age of seventeen she appeared in the second series of "Fist of Fun", the BBC comedy show from Stewart Lee and Richard Herring as a schoolgirl in a series of sketches entitled 'Teachers' (one of her co-stars was the young Daniel Mays). She studied at the Italia Conti Academy of Theatre Arts in London for three years during this time before becoming a professional model at the age of 16.

Modelling career

Brook's modelling career began at 16 after she won a beauty competition, into which she had been entered by her mother. She later worked on a range of advertising campaigns, including Foster's Lager, Renault Mégane, Walker's crisps, Piz Buin and Bravissimo, a company that specialises in bras and lingerie for large-breasted women. Soon after she caught the eye of the editorial team of the Daily Star tabloid, which began featuring her as a Page Three girl.

Brook's picture soon began appearing in other lads' mags such as GQ, Loaded and FHM. A poll over 5,000 women for Grazia magazine considered her to have the best British female body. She also topped the 'FHM 100 Sexiest Women in the World' list in 2005, which was said to have polled 15 million people. Appearing in this list every year since 1998, she ranked No.34 in 2008, No.67 in 2009 and No.7 in 2010. She was the cover star of FHM'''s World Cup 2010 special issue, and was on the cover of the magazine in April 2011.

In February 2007, it was announced that Brook had signed a contract, reported to be worth around £1m, to represent Unilever's Lynx body spray, known as "Axe" in the US and in continental Europe. She has appeared on billboards, in newspapers and on-line as part of their advertising campaign. She has also appeared in commercials for Sky+ and T-Mobile and modelled for Reebok.

In 2010, she was chosen as the "new face and body" of lingerie maker Ultimo's advertising campaign. In September 2010, Brook appeared in the American edition of Playboy magazine. In October 2010, Brook appeared live at Clapham Picture House to surprise cinemagoers as part of a promotion for Carlsberg and Sky 3D. In November 2010, Brook presented an award at MTV's EMA's in Madrid.

Brook produced a line of swimwear with New Look, for which she herself has modelled. In September 2014, Brook launched a clothing line for Simply Be. The following year, she became a brand ambassador for Skechers.

 Acting career 
In 2000 Brook made her full screen debut with a minor role in the film Sorted. Shortly thereafter, she appeared in the film Ripper. She played the girlfriend of Clark Kent/Superman's nemesis Lex Luthor in four episodes of the American science fiction drama Smallville during the show's first season (2001–02). She has also completed assignments as a film actress in Canada and made a short appearance as Lyle's girlfriend in the 2003 film The Italian Job.

Her first starring role was in the 2004 film School for Seduction, for which she received positive reviews for her role. In 2004, she played character Nikki Morris in the video game Need for Speed Underground 2, alongside Brooke Burke. In 2005, she appeared in the Philippe Vidal thriller House of 9, and starred opposite Billy Zane in the mystery survival thriller Survival Island, also known as Three.

In 2006, she starred in an Agatha Christie's Marple drama on ITV and appeared as herself throughout the second series of Moving Wallpaper, also for ITV, in 2009. She acted in the science fiction thriller Shadow Play, directed by Nick Simon.

Brook had a leading role in the horror comedy remake Piranha 3D. The film received a worldwide theatrical release on 20 August 2010. Piranha 3D opened to generally positive reviews and commercial success, grossing $83,188,163 on a budget of $24,000,000.

Kelly also played as herself in the 2012 British comedy film Keith Lemon: The Film. In 2013 Brook appeared in the video to Lawson's song "Juliet". In 2014 she was cast as Prudence in an NBC sitcom pilot called One Big Happy, which was subsequently picked up on 9 May.

Theatre
In December 2000, she played exotic dancer Anya in the play Eye Contact at the Riverside Studios in Hammersmith.
In October 2008, she returned to the West End as Jeannie, in Neil LaBute's Fat Pig at London's Comedy Theatre.

In November 2009, she began playing Celia in Calendar Girls at the Noël Coward Theatre.

Brook made a cameo appearance in the cabaret show "Forever Crazy" by Crazy Horse London end of 2012.

Other work
Music videos
In 1997, at age 17, Brook appeared as a nurse in the music video for the KMFDM song "Megalomaniac". That same year, Brook appeared in the video for Pulp's "Help the Aged" with Huck Whitney of the band the Flaming Stars, in a slow dance sequence.

Television presenting
In 1997, aged 18, Brook started presenting youth television programmes on MTV UK & Ireland, Granada Television and the Trouble TV channel. Brook had a breakthrough into mainstream presenting in January 1999, when she was chosen to replace Denise van Outen as the female half of The Big Breakfast hosting team, alongside Johnny Vaughan. She left the show in July 1999. In 2005, she hosted the reality television programme Celebrity Love Island for ITV.

Reality television
In 2007, Brook participated in the celebrity dancing competition Strictly Come Dancing on BBC1, with dance partner was Brendan Cole. During the TV series, her father Kenneth Parsons died of cancer, and although she initially decided to continue dancing in his memory, she withdrew from the competition in week nine.

She also competed in the Strictly Come Dancing Christmas Special 2008, dancing the Jive with Brian Fortuna, Brendan Cole having to compete with his later partner Lisa Snowdon. Brook and Fortuna were put into fourth place, but with the studio audience's vote they came second to Jill Halfpenny and Darren Bennett.
In 2008, Brook took Jennifer Ellison's place as one of the three judges on the second series of the reality TV programme Dirty Dancing: The Time of Your Life, broadcast between September and November 2008.

In January 2009, she joined the third series of Britain's Got Talent as a fourth judge, but was subsequently axed from the programme after less than a week on the panel, the producers having decided the four-judge format was "too complicated". Brook was billed as a guest judge in the episode in which she appeared, taped in Manchester and aired on 16 May.

In 2013, Brook became a temporary team captain on Celebrity Juice aired on ITV2. She appeared in Season 9, replacing Fearne Cotton while she was on maternity leave. In 2016, Brook served as a team captain on the Channel 5 panel show It's Not Me, It's You.

In 2021, Brook appeared on The Masked Dancer, masked as Frog. She was the eighth celebrity to be unmasked in the semi-final.

 Books 
In September 2014, Brook released her autobiography; it reached the Sunday Times Bestseller list on 21 September. Domestic violence groups criticised her during her promotional tour for laughing about punching ex-boyfriends Jason Statham and Danny Cipriani in the face.

 Business 
At end of 2013 Brook opened her bar Steam and Rye in London. In June 2014 Steam and Rye won Bar of the Year at the London Club and Bar Awards.

 Radio 
Since January 2019, Brook has co-presented Heart London Drivetime and Saturday Breakfast with Jason King.

Personal life
Brook met American actor Billy Zane while filming thriller Survival Island in Eleuthera, The Bahamas, in 2004. Brook and Zane were engaged to be married in mid-2008 and acquired a house in Kent, but Brook postponed the wedding upon the death of her father in November 2007. The couple ended their relationship in April 2008 and briefly reconciled before ending their relationship for good in August 2008.

Brook was romantically linked with rugby player Thom Evans. On 16 March 2011, Brook announced, via her Twitter account, that she was pregnant and that she and Evans were expecting a baby girl. On 9 May 2011, it was reported that Brook had miscarried. She announced on 1 February 2013 via Twitter that she and Evans had broken up.

In 2014, private photos of Brook and her ex-boyfriend David McIntosh were circulated online.

Brook married her longtime boyfriend Jeremy Parisi in July 2022.

Filmography

 Film 

 Television 

 Television advertisements 

 Music videos 

 Bibliography 

 Close Up'' (2014) (autobiography)

References

External links

 
 JK and Kelly Brook on Heart Radio
 

1979 births
Living people
Actresses from Kent
Alumni of the Italia Conti Academy of Theatre Arts
English female models
English film actresses
English radio presenters
English television presenters
Glamour models
Handbag collectors
Page 3 girls
People from Rochester, Kent
20th-century English actresses
21st-century English actresses
English television actresses
British women radio presenters